Johannes Bernardus Marie (Jan) Vranken (born 1948) is a professor in the Private Law Department of Tilburg University, The Netherlands.

Vranken specializes in Civil Law, Civil Procedure, Jurisprudence and Methodology in private law on which subjects he has published extensively. He received an honorary doctorate from Leiden University and built his reputation as a distinguished practician and theoretician in civil law as Advocate General at the Supreme Court of the Netherlands. He has been appointed as Director of Schoordijk Institute of Tilburg University (Research School for Legislative Studies). In addition, he was awarded the Royal Honour in the order of the Dutch Lion.

Vranken is a member of the Royal Netherlands Academy of Arts and Sciences since 1993.

References

External links 
https://archive.today/20060428202553/http://www.creamofscience.org/nl/page/keur.view/282.keur

1948 births
Living people
Dutch jurists
Academic staff of Tilburg University
Members of the Royal Netherlands Academy of Arts and Sciences
Radboud University Nijmegen alumni
Knights of the Order of the Netherlands Lion